68 Whiskey is an American military comedy-drama television series created by Roberto Benabib. Based on the Israeli television series Charlie Golf One (known as Taagad in ), it premiered on January 15, 2020 on the Paramount Network. In September 2020, the series was canceled after one season.

Cast and characters

Main
 Sam Keeley as Cooper Roback
 Gage Golightly as Grace Durkin
 Cristina Rodlo as Sergeant Rosa Alvarez 
 Jeremy Tardy as Staff Sergeant Mekhi Davis
 Nicholas Coombe as Anthony Petrocelli
 Fahim Fazli as warlord
 Derek Theler as Sasquatch
 Beth Riesgraf as Major Sonia Holloway
 Lamont Thompson as Colonel Harlan Austin

Recurring
 Usman Ally as Captain Hazara
 Artur Benson as Khalil
 Aaron Glenane as Chef Colin Gale
 Linc Hand as Crash
 Jade Albany as Cassola
 Omar Maskati as Qasem

Episodes

Production

Development
On July 9, 2018, it was announced that Paramount Network had given the production a pilot order. The pilot was directed by Michael Lehmann and written by Roberto Benabib who were also set to executive produce alongside Brian Grazer, Francie Calfo, Zion Rubin, Efrat Shmaya Dror, Danna Stern, Samie Kim Falvey and Michael Lehmann. On April 30, 2019, it was reported that Paramount Network had given the production a series order for a first season consisting of ten episodes. Production companies involved with the series were slated to consist of CBS Television Studios, Imagine Television, and yes Studios. The series premiered on January 15, 2020. On September 2, 2020, Paramount Network canceled the series after one season.

In an extended Twitter thread in 2021, staff writer Dylan Park-Pettiford and story editor Caitie Delaney revealed that a writer on the series fabricated a career in the Marines in order to get a job, and was only found out and removed mid-season due to Park-Pettiford's suspicions.

Casting
In September 2019, it was announced that Sam Keeley, Gage Golightly, Cristina Rodlo, Jeremy Tardy, Nicholas Coombe, Derek Theler, Beth Riesgraf, and Lamont Thompson were cast as series regulars while Usman Ally, Artur Benson, and Aaron Glenane were cast in recurring roles. In October 2019, Linc Hand and Jade Albany joined the cast in recurring capacities.

Reception

Critical response
On the review aggregation website Rotten Tomatoes, the series holds an approval rating of 88% with an average rating of 6/10, based on 8 reviews. Metacritic, which uses a weighted average, assigned the series a score of 61 out of 100 based on 4 critics, indicating "generally favorable reviews."

Ratings

References

External links

2020 American television series debuts
2020 American television series endings
2020s American comedy-drama television series
American military television series
American television series based on Israeli television series
English-language television shows
Paramount Network original programming
Television series by CBS Studios
Television series by Imagine Entertainment